The 2014–15 season is the Crvena zvezda 70th season in the existence of the club. The team played in the Basketball League of Serbia, in the Adriatic League and in the Euroleague.

Overview 
In the summer of 2014, Red Star signed Nikola Kalinić and Stefan Jović from Radnički Kragujevac, NBA prospect Nemanja Dangubić, center Maik Zirbes and finalized a huge signing of point guard Marcus Williams. In season 2014–15, the club participated in EuroLeague, winning 6 out of 10 games in regular season, reaching Top 16 and seeing its average home attendance rising to 14483. In Adriatic league, it set a new record of 20 consecutive victories, ending league competition with score 24–2, losing only to Krka and Partizan. In the playoffs, Zvezda triumphed over Partizan 3–1 in the semifinals, and 3–1 over Cedevita Zagreb in the finals, winning its first trophy in this competition and securing a place in Euroleague in the 2015–2016 season. Zvezda also won Radivoj Korać Cup for the third time in a row. In Basketball League of Serbia, Zvezda entered playoffs with 13 wins and only one lost game. In the semifinals, it defeated Mega Leks 2–0, and in the final triumphed over great rival Partizan, 3–0.

Players

Squad information
Note: Flags indicate national team eligibility at FIBA sanctioned events. Players may hold other non-FIBA nationality not displayed.

Depth chart

Players with multiple nationalities
   Đorđe Kaplanović

Out on loan

Players In

Players Out

Club

Technical Staff

Kit

Supplier: Champion
Main sponsor: mts

Back sponsor: Idea
Short sponsor:

Competitions

Overall

Overview

Adriatic League

League table

Results by round

Matches

Playoffs

EuroLeague

Regular season table 

|}

Regular season matches
Source: EuroLeague

Top 16 table 

|}

Top 16 matches
Source: EuroLeague

Serbian Super League

League table

Results by round

Matches
Source: eurobasket.com

Playoffs

Radivoj Korać Cup

Individual awards

EuroLeague 
MVP of the Week

All-Euroleague First Team

Individual statistics leaders
 Rating per game:  Boban Marjanović (25.67)
 Rebounds per game:  Boban Marjanović (10.67)

Adriatic League 
MVP of the Round

MVP of the Month

Ideal Starting Five

Coach of the season
 Dejan Radonjić

Serbian Super League
MVP of the Round

Super League MVP
  Boban Marjanović

Radivoj Korać Cup
Finals MVP
  Luka Mitrović

Statistics

EuroLeague

See also 
 2014–15 Red Star Belgrade season
 2014–15 KK Partizan season

Notes

References

External links
 KK Crvena zvezda official website 
 Club info at the Adriatic League official site
 Club info at the EuroLeague official site

KK Crvena Zvezda seasons
2014–15 in Serbian basketball by club
Crvena zvezda